Scotland competed at the 2018 Commonwealth Games in Gold Coast, Australia from 4 April to 15 April 2018. It was Scotland's 21st appearance at the Commonwealth Games, having competed at every Games since their inception in 1930.

Track and field athlete Eilidh Doyle was the country's flag bearer during the opening ceremony.

Competitors

|  style="text-align:left; width:78%; vertical-align:top;"|
The following is the list of number of competitors participating at the Games per sport/discipline.

Medallists

| style="text-align:left; vertical-align:top;"|

Relay competitors named in italics did not participate in the corresponding finals.

Athletics

Team Scotland announced the majority of its squad on 12 December 2017. Changes have been made since then and the 23-strong squad of 9 men and 14 women is accurate as of 1 March 2018.

It includes Beth Potter, who by virtue of already being selected for the triathlon will be the first ever Scot to contest two sports at the same Commonwealth Games.

Men
Track & road events

Field events

Women
Track & road events

Field events

Combined events – Heptathlon

Badminton

Team Scotland announced its squad of 8 players (5 men and 3 women) on 14 February 2018.

Singles

Doubles

Mixed team

Roster

Martin Campbell
Alexander Dunn
Kirsty Gilmour
Adam Hall
Patrick MacHugh
Julie MacPherson
Kieran Merrilees
Eleanor O'Donnell

Pool A

Quarterfinals

Basketball

Scotland was invited by FIBA and the CGF to enter a team of 12 men.

The squad was announced on 17 January 2018.

Men's tournament

Roster

Kieron Achara
Jonathan Bunyan
Bantu Burroughs
Chris Cleary
Nick Collins
Alasdair Fraser
Kyle Jimenez
Callan Low
Fraser Malcolm
Gareth Murray
Sean Nealon-Lino
Michael Vigor

Pool B

Qualifying finals

Semifinals

Bronze medal match

Beach volleyball

Scotland qualified a team of two men by winning the European Qualification Tournament in Cyprus. In addition, they accepted an invitation by FIVB and the CGF to enter a team of two women.

Boxing

Team Scotland announced the majority of its 11-strong squad (9 men and 2 women) on 30 November 2017.

Following a men's light heavyweight box-off at the GB Boxing Championships, another boxer was added on 12 December 2017. A further addition to the squad was made on 1 February 2018.

Men

Women

Cycling

Team Scotland announced its squad on 14 February 2018. Andy Fenn subsequently withdrew himself due to changes in his race programme, ergo the 15-strong squad now consists of 9 men and 6 women.

Road
Men

Women

Track
Sprint

Keirin

Time trial

Pursuit

Points race

Scratch race

Mountain bike

Diving

Team Scotland announced its squad of 4 divers (2 men and 2 women) on 14 February 2018.

Men

Women

Gymnastics

Team Scotland announced the majority of its 10-strong squad (5 men and 5 women) on 14 February 2018. Further additions to the squad were made on 20 February 2018 and 1 March 2018.

Artistic

Men
Team Final & Individual Qualification

Individual Finals

Women
Team Final & Individual Qualification

Individual Finals

Hockey

Scotland qualified both men's and women's teams by placing in the top nine (excluding the host nation, Australia) among Commonwealth nations in the FIH World Rankings as of 31 October 2017. Each team consists of 18 players for a total of 36.

Both initial teams were announced on 14 February 2018. The current teams are correct as of 9 March 2018.

Men's tournament

Squad

Tommy Alexander
Russell Anderson
Kenneth Bain
Michael Bremner
Gavin Byers
Callum Duke
Alan Forsyth
David Forsyth
Cameron Fraser
Chris Grassick
Rob Harwood
William Marshall
Steven McIlravey
Gordon McIntyre
Lee Morton
Nick Parkes
Duncan Riddell
Jamie Wong

Pool A

Fifth and sixth place

Women's tournament

Squad

Amy Brodie
Camilla Brown
Nicki Cochrane
Robyn Collins
Rebecca Condie
Amy Costello
Kareena Cuthbert
Mairi Drummond
Amy Gibson
Alison Howie
Sarah Jamieson
Lucy Lanigan
Nikki Lloyd
Sarah Robertson
Katie Robertson
Nicola Skrastin
Rebecca Ward
Charlotte Watson

Pool B

Seventh and eighth place

Lawn bowls

Team Scotland announced its squad of 17 lawn bowlers and directors (10 men and 7 women) in two tranches.

The first tranche of 10 participants was announced on 3 October 2017; the second tranche of 7 participants was announced on 30 November 2017.

Men

Women

Para-sport

Netball

Scotland qualified a team of 12 players by virtue of being ranked in the top 11 (excluding the host nation, Australia) of the INF World Rankings on 1 July 2017.

Pool B

Ninth place match

Rugby sevens

Scotland qualified a team for the men's tournament by being among the top nine ranked nations from the Commonwealth in the 2016–17 World Rugby Sevens Series ranking.

The 13-strong squad was named on 15 March 2018.

Men's tournament

Squad

Glenn BryceMatt FagersonJamie FarndaleJames FlemingNyle GodsmarkDarcy GrahamGeorge HorneRuaridh JacksonLee JonesGavin LoweMax McFarlandJoe NayacavouScott Riddell

Pool A

Classification semi-finals

Match for fifth place

Shooting

Team Scotland announced the majority of its 13-strong squad (7 men and 6 women) on 30 November 2017. Further additions to the squad were made on 14 February 2018 and 1 March 2018.

Men

Women

Open

Squash

Team Scotland announced its squad of 5 players (3 men and 2 women) in two tranches.

The first tranche of 2 players was announced on 8 November 2017; the second tranche of 3 players was announced on 20 February 2018.

Singles

Doubles

Swimming

Team Scotland announced the majority of its 25-strong squad (15 men and 10 women) on 3 October 2017.

Two para-swimmers were added on 17 January 2018 and two swimmers were added on 14 February 2018.

Men

Women

Table tennis

Team Scotland announced its squad of 3 players (all men) on 17 January 2018.

Singles

Doubles

Team

Triathlon

Team Scotland announced the majority of its 5-strong squad (2 men and 3 women) on 30 November 2017. The fifth triathlete was announced on 17 January 2018.

Individual

Mixed Relay

Paratriathlon

Weightlifting

Team Scotland announced its squad of 4 weightlifters (2 men and 2 women) on 30 November 2017.

A powerlifter was added on 17 January 2018.

Powerlifting

Scotland participated with 1 athlete (1 man).

Wrestling

Team Scotland announced its squad of 4 wrestlers (all men) on 14 February 2018.

Men

References

Nations at the 2018 Commonwealth Games
Scotland at the Commonwealth Games
Commonwealth Games